Thirumalairajan  is a river flowing in the Thanjavur, Tiruvarur and Nagapattinam districts of the Indian state of Tamil Nadu and Karaikal district of Puducherry. The river splits from Kudamurutti, a tributary of Kaveri river at Rajagiri near Papanasam, Thanjavur district. The river enters Bay of Bengal at Tirumalarajanpattinam near Karaikal.The river has a 150 years old bridge built by a king, who ruled the nearby places of the river.The bridge is also named after the river, the thirumalairajan river bridge.

References

See also 
List of rivers of Tamil Nadu

Rivers of Tamil Nadu
Nagapattinam district
Rivers of India